Michael Dal Colle (born June 20, 1996) is a Canadian professional ice hockey player. He is currently playing with HC TPS in the Liiga. Dal Colle was selected by the New York Islanders in the first round (fifth overall) of the 2014 NHL Entry Draft. Dal Colle was born in Richmond Hill, Ontario, but grew up in Vaughan, Ontario.

Playing career
Dal Colle was selected seventh overall in the 2012 OHL Priority Selection by the Oshawa Generals. He was rated as a top prospect prior to the 2014 NHL Entry Draft.

Dal Colle was recognized for his outstanding performance during the 2012–13 season when he was named to the OHL First All-Rookie Team. He also won a gold medal with Team Canada at the 2013 Ivan Hlinka Memorial Tournament.

On September 28, 2014, the Islanders announced that they had signed Dal Colle to a three-year entry level contract. On January 1, 2016, Oshawa traded Dal Colle to the Kingston Frontenacs in exchange for Robbie Burt and four draft picks. At the conclusion of the OHL season, Dal Colle joined the Bridgeport Sound Tigers, the Islanders American Hockey League (AHL) affiliate.

Dal Colle began the 2017–18 season with the Sound Tigers after being cut from the Islanders training camp. Dal Colle was called up from the Sound Tigers on January 11 and made his NHL debut with the Islanders on January 13, 2018, against the New York Rangers.

Dal Colle attended the Islanders training camp prior to the 2018–19 season but was reassigned to the Sound Tigers. On January 3, 2019, Dal Colle and teammate Sebastian Aho were selected to represent the Sound Tigers at the AHL All-Star Classic. On January 17, 2019, Dal Colle scored his first NHL goal in a 4–1 Islanders' victory over the New Jersey Devils. He was reassigned to the Sound Tigers shortly thereafter only to be recalled again on an emergency basis on March 5, 2019. In his first game back, Dal Colle recorded an assist off Devon Toews' goal to help the Islanders win 5–4 over the Ottawa Senators. On March 8, Dal Colle's emergency recall status was changed to a regular recall. The Islanders re-signed Dal Colle on September 21, 2021.

After the 2021–22 season, Dal Colle was not re-signed by the Islanders, making him an unrestricted free agent. On September 15, 2022, Dal Colle signed a professional try-out with the Ottawa Senators. He was released from the tryout on October 1, 2022.

Personal life
Dal Colle was raised in Vaughan, Ontario as the youngest of three children to Gus and Wendy Dal Colle, having an older brother, Jonluca, who is autistic, and a sister, Daniela, who played hockey at Niagara University. Dal Colle is of Italian descent from his paternal side, with his grandparents, Bruno and Gilda, emigrating from Verona, while his mother is of Irish descent.

Career statistics

Regular season and playoffs

International

Awards and honours

References

External links
 

1996 births
Living people
Bridgeport Islanders players
Bridgeport Sound Tigers players
Canadian ice hockey left wingers
Canadian people of Italian descent
Ice hockey people from Ontario
Kingston Frontenacs players
National Hockey League first-round draft picks
New York Islanders draft picks
New York Islanders players
Oshawa Generals players
People from Vaughan
Sportspeople from Richmond Hill, Ontario
HC TPS players